Arnaud Clément and Michaël Llodra were the defending champions, but did not participate this year.

Julian Knowle and Jürgen Melzer won the title, defeating Jonas Björkman and Max Mirnyi 4–6, 7–5, 7–5 in the final.

Seeds

Draw

Draw

External links
Draw

St. Petersburg Open
2005 ATP Tour
2005 in Russian tennis